Ilya Nikolaevich Golenishchev-Kutuzov (1904–1969) was a Soviet philologist, poet, and translator. He was an expert on Romanic and Slavic philology, and comparative literature. He authored works on Dante Alighieri and the Renaissance literature.

References
О. А. Белоброва. "ГОЛЕНИЩЕВ-КУТУЗОВ Илья Николаевич" (in Russian). Fundamental Electronic Library "Russian Literature & Folklore".

Soviet philologists
Soviet poets
1904 births
1969 deaths
Soviet translators